Gabriela Vargas Talavera (born 1988) is a Paraguayan chess player. She was awarded the title of Woman International Master by FIDE in 2019.

She is a computer scientist by profession.

Chess career 
She has represented Paraguay in the Women's Chess Olympiad, including:
 2008, where she scored 8½/10 on board one.
 2010, scoring 6½/11 on board one.
 2012, scoring 6/11 on board one.
 2014, scoring 6/10 on board one.
 2016, scoring 7½/11 on board one.

She finished first in the Montevideo Zonal 2.5 to qualify for the Women's Chess World Cup 2021, where she was defeated 2-0 by Elina Danielian in the first round.

References

External links

Gabriela Vargas games at 365Chess.com

1988 births
Living people
Paraguayan chess players
Date of birth missing (living people)